Burkinabè Rising (also Burkinabé Rising): the art of resistance in Burkina Faso is a 2018 long documentary film directed and produced by Iara Lee.

Production
The documentary was produced by Cultures of Resistance films, in Burkina Faso, Bulgaria and United States in English, French and Mooré and lasts 72 minutes.

Plot/Synopsis
The documentary displays nonviolent atists and citizens of Burkina Faso pave way in an engaged manner, for a new day in the politics of their nation. Hemce, showing an example worthy of emulation to the continent of Africa and the whole world. The film features a people with a revolutionary spirit akin to that of its former leader (1983-1987), Thomas Sankara, killed in a coup d'etat by a friend of his and successor, Blaise Compaoré, by way of music, film, ecology, visual art and architecture. Compaoré who ruled for 27 years afterwards in October 2014 got removed by a great popular insurrection, with the spirit remaining with the people even yet.

Travelling across the country to film the documentary, BURKINABÈ RISING: the art of resistance in Burkina Faso, its director, Iara Lee mets an interesting set of cast of artists, musicians and activists, bent at promoting the culture of the through the arts for which the country is known for. The rapper, Joey le Soldat, makes references to the struggles of the impoverished youth in Ouagadougou and of the toiling farmers in the country side; the graffiti artist, Marto, decries injustice by giving colourful mural designs to the city walls; the women's rights activist, Malika la Slameuse, from a feminist perspective on a male-dominated art form performs poetry; the dancer, Serge Aimé Coulibaly, from his dance movement encourages his viewers to take political action.

The film also documents a festival of recycled art and interviews farmer groups resisting the encroachment of corporate agriculture. Im total, the film expresses different individuals in different walks of life search for peace and justice by means of cultural expression.

Cast
 Le Balai Citoyen
 Serge Bayala
 Bouda Blandine
 Konaté Bomavé
 Séré Boukson
 Aimé Césa
 Raissa Compaoré
 Serge Aimé Coulibaly
 Sophie Garcia
 Emmanuel Ilboudo
 Hado Ima
 Jean-Marie Koalga
 Sahab Koanda
 Jean-Robert Koudogbo Kiki
 Souleymane Ladji Koné
 Bil Aka Kora
 Sanou Lagassane
 Benjamin Lebrave
 Ki Léonce
 Mabiisi
 Marto
 Alif Naaba
 Bend Naaba
 Arnaud Ouambatou
 Mohamed Ouedraogo
 Qu'on Sonne et Voix-Ailes
 Blandine Sankara
 Odile Sankara
 Salia Sanou
 Sophie Sedgho
 Malika La Slameuse
 Smockey
 Snake
 Joey Le Soldat
 Fatou Souratie
 Ali Tapsoba
 Gualbert Thiombiano
 Issa Tiendrébéodo
 Ousmane Tiendrébéodo
 Gidéon Vink
 Onasis Wendker
 Blandine Yameogo
 Amina Yanogo

Reception
The film was screened by Suns Cinema, Washington DC in collaboration with Cultures of Resistance on October 16, 2018. It was also screened at the Sembène Film Festival on March 25, 2019.

The film was awarded the Best Documentary Film award and got nominations for Best Original Score and Outstanding Woman Director awards at the New York City's 7th annual Winter Film Awards International Film Festival (WFAIFF) in 2018.

Accolades

References

External links
 Burkinabè Rising on IMDb
 Burkinabè Rising on Film at Lincoln Center
 Burkinabè Rising on Africavenir
 BURKINABÈ RISING: THE ART OF RESISTANCE IN BURKINA FASO on Womex

2018 films
Burkinabé documentary films
English-language Burkinabé films